Tibor Keszthelyi (born 19 January 1960) is a Hungarian water polo player. He competed in the men's tournament at the 1988 Summer Olympics.

References

1960 births
Living people
Hungarian male water polo players
Olympic water polo players of Hungary
Water polo players at the 1988 Summer Olympics
Water polo players from Budapest
20th-century Hungarian people